NQ may refer to:
 Air Japan (IATA airline designator LY)
 Nuqat al Khams (Libya) (ISO 3166-2 code LY)
 NQ Vulpeculae, a 1976 nova
 National Qualifications, in secondary schools and colleges of further education in Scotland
 Normal Quality, a display resolution mode
 Northern Quarter (Manchester) in Manchester city centre, UK
 NQ Mobile, a non-carrier provider of mobile Internet services (NYSE stock symbol NQ)
 North Queensland, the Northern Region is the northern part of the Australian state of Queensland that lies just south of Far North Queensland